Felix Mooney (1868–unknown) was an English footballer who played in the Football League for Ardwick and Bury.

References

1868 births
Date of death unknown
English footballers
Association football forwards
English Football League players
Bootle F.C. (1879) players
Manchester City F.C. players
Bury F.C. players
Walsall F.C. players
Telford United F.C. players
Shrewsbury Town F.C. players